Jasmin Mujdža (born 2 March 1974) is a Bosnian-Croatian retired footballer. Since 2016, he is a fitness coach for South Korean club FC Seoul.

International career
Mujdža made his debut for Bosnia and Herzegovina in a May 1998 friendly match away against Argentina and has earned a total of 9 caps, scoring no goals. His final international was an August 2000 friendly against Turkey.

Personal life
His younger brother, Mensur, is also a former footballer.

Honours
Hajduk Split
 Croatian Cup: 2000

Zagreb
 Prva HNL: 2001-02

Rijeka
 Croatian Cup: 2005

Zadar
 Druga HNL promotion: 2006-07

References

External links
 
 

1974 births
Living people
Footballers from Zagreb
Bosniaks of Croatia
Association football midfielders
Croatian footballers
Bosnia and Herzegovina footballers
Bosnia and Herzegovina international footballers
NK Samobor players
HNK Hajduk Split players
Hapoel Petah Tikva F.C. players
NK Zagreb players
Seongnam FC players
HNK Rijeka players
NK Kamen Ingrad players
NK Zadar players
NK Hrvatski Dragovoljac players
First Football League (Croatia) players
Croatian Football League players
Israeli Premier League players
K League 1 players
Bosnia and Herzegovina expatriate footballers
Expatriate footballers in South Korea
Bosnia and Herzegovina expatriate sportspeople in South Korea
Expatriate footballers in Israel
Bosnia and Herzegovina expatriate sportspeople in Israel
Bosnia and Herzegovina football managers
HNK Segesta managers
FC Seoul non-playing staff